Miami based Cuban flutist Diana López Moyal. Cuban musician, performer and teacher.

Biography 
Diana López Moyal was born in the City of Havana, Cuba. A graduate of bachelor of music (Flute) in the Higher Institute of Art, in 1986 and is named professor of the Amadeo Roldan Conservatory.
Diana joined the Cuban band rock 'Géminis' (1980-1984).
From 1986 until 1992 she served on the National Concert Band.
In 1991 she joined the guitarist Luis Manuel Molina to form part of the 'Duo Cáliz'. Still in 1994 invited to the "International Guitar Festival Ponferrada 94" and to perform a concert at the Ateneo de Madrid, by the Spanish Society of the guitar.
At the end of 1994 founded, together with the pianist Silvia Alonso the 'Duo Transparency"  and travel to Mexico in 1998 invited by the Casa del Lago and cultural diffusion of the UNAM.

Added to this is 'Istria Ensemble': a project of chamber with the soprano Iris Zemva, offering concerts at different places of the country and a disc titled "L'Opera, le piu belle Arie di Mozart a Puccini".

In April 1999 is invited to the Seventh International Festival of the flute in University hall Carlos Chávez, premiering works by Mexican composers.

From 2000 to date has been doing concerts for different scenarios of the country, together with educational activities (Canadian Institute of Mexico and workshops of choral singing at the Colegio de Mexico).

Diana was professor of flute at the Universidad de las Américas (UDLA) in the city of Puebla (2005 - 2010).
In 2006 she became professor of music at the Mexican Institute of hearing and language (IMAL), working in the musical education of children with hearing impairment and of the language.

In the 2010 starts as professor of piano and flute of the pupils of the postulancy of the Universidad La Salle.

In the summer of 2013 begins to teach piano lessons at ERM Performing Arts: 'Centro de Formación Integración en Artes Escénicas' preparing actors in artistic disciplines like Singing, Dance, Music and Acting.

On September, she becomes Music teacher and tutor at "Mis Amigos Languages" Languages Through Art, Music and Games in Coral Gables, Miami.

April 23, 2015 marks the beginnings of a new project: L&L DUET, with pianist Teresita De León; offering a recital at The English Center in the same city.

From August 2016, Diana enrolls officially The English Center as a Music Teacher. Tenure she holds presently.

Discography 
Ernesto Lecuona Ensemble:

 Album de Cuba

Istria Ensemble:

 ÍL’Opera, le piu belle arie di Mozart a Puccini
DUO TRANSPARENCIA:
 Transparencia

Also 
 Luis Manuel Molina

References

External links 
 
 Blog
 Official MySpace
 Music

20th-century Cuban musicians
Cuban musicians
Cuban flautists
1962 births
Mexican flautists
Living people
Women flautists
20th-century women musicians
20th-century flautists